Post Proper Northside, also known as Post Proper North or Barangay 30, is one of the barangays of Makati, a city in Metro Manila, Philippines. It consists of most of Bonifacio Global City which is under the de facto administration of neighboring Taguig, that claims it as its own territory under its own barangay Fort Bonifacio, as well as a small area north of the business district which includes the Makati City Jail.

Geography
Most of the area is currently under the de facto jurisdiction of Taguig, under its barangay Fort Bonifacio, while the remaining small area is under the control of Makati, located between barangays Cembo and West Rembo.

Demographics
As per the 2015 census by the Philippine Statistics Authority, the barangay has a population of 28,572.

References

Makati